Cory Todd Wilson (born August 8, 1970) is an American attorney and jurist serving as a U.S. circuit judge of the U.S. Court of Appeals for the Fifth Circuit. Wilson was previously a judge on the Mississippi Court of Appeals and a member of the Mississippi House of Representatives.

Early life and education 

Wilson was born in 1970 in Pascagoula, Mississippi. He graduated from the University of Mississippi in 1992 with a Bachelor of Business Administration summa cum laude and also received the Taylor Medal in Economics, awarded to the top student in the department. He then attended Yale Law School, where he was a member of the Yale Law Journal and an Olin Fellow in Economics. He graduated in 1995 with a Juris Doctor.

Legal and legislative career 

Upon graduation from law school, Wilson served as a law clerk to Judge Emmett Ripley Cox of the United States Court of Appeals for the Eleventh Circuit. He also served as a White House Fellow in the Department of Defense as a Special Assistant to Secretary of Defense Donald Rumsfeld. Before serving in the Mississippi legislature, Wilson served as Senior Advisor and Counsel in the Mississippi State Treasurer's Office and as Deputy Secretary of State in the Mississippi Secretary of State's Office.

Wilson has been an intermittent member of the Federalist Society, including while at Yale Law School from 1992 to 1995, and then joining the Mississippi chapter from 1996 to 2005 and again since 2019.

Mississippi House of Representatives 

Wilson served as a member of the Mississippi House of Representatives from 2016 to 2019.

Judicial career

State judicial service 
In December 2018, Wilson was appointed to the Mississippi Court of Appeals to the seat vacated by Kenny Griffis, who was elevated to the Mississippi Supreme Court. He was sworn into office on February 15, 2019. His service as a state judge ended on July 2, 2020 when he was elevated as a Circuit Judge to the Fifth Circuit Court.

Federal judicial service

Withdrawn nomination to district court 
On August 28, 2019, President Donald Trump announced his intent to nominate Wilson to serve as a United States district judge for the United States District Court for the Southern District of Mississippi. On October 15, his nomination was sent to the Senate. President Trump nominated Wilson to the seat vacated by Judge Louis Guirola Jr., who assumed senior status on March 23, 2018. On January 3, 2020, his nomination was returned to the President under Rule XXXI, Paragraph 6 of the United States Senate. 
On January 6, 2020, his renomination was sent to the Senate. On January 8, 2020, the Senate Judiciary Committee held a hearing on his nomination. During his confirmation hearing, some senators asked about Wilson's past comments on social media about President Barack Obama, Hillary Clinton and Alexandria Ocasio-Cortez, as well as his previous positions, as a state legislator, on abortion, LGBT rights, the Affordable Care Act, and voting rights. His nomination to that district court was withdrawn on May 4, 2020 when he was nominated to the 5th Circuit Court.

Court of appeals service 
On March 30, 2020, President Donald Trump announced his intent to nominate Wilson to serve as a United States circuit judge for the United States Court of Appeals for the Fifth Circuit, to fill the seat vacated by Judge E. Grady Jolly, who assumed senior status on October 3, 2017. On May 4, 2020, his nomination was sent to the Senate. On May 18, 2020, the American Bar Association rated Wilson as "well qualified," its highest rating. On May 20, 2020, the Senate Judiciary Committee held a hearing on Wilson's nomination. On June 11, 2020, Wilson's nomination was reported out of committee by a 12–10 vote. On June 22, 2020, the Senate invoked cloture on Wilson's nomination by a 51–43 vote. On June 24, 2020, Wilson's nomination was confirmed by a 52–48 vote. Wilson's confirmation marked the 200th confirmation of a federal judge nominated by Donald Trump. Wilson was the sixth judge nominated by Trump to be confirmed to the Fifth Circuit. Wilson received his judicial commission on July 3, 2020.

See also 
 Donald Trump judicial appointment controversies

References

External links 
 
 

|-

|-

1970 births
Living people
20th-century American lawyers
21st-century American lawyers
21st-century American judges
21st-century American politicians
Federalist Society members
Judges of the United States Court of Appeals for the Fifth Circuit
Republican Party members of the Mississippi House of Representatives
Mississippi College School of Law faculty
Mississippi Court of Appeals judges
Mississippi lawyers
People from Pascagoula, Mississippi
United States court of appeals judges appointed by Donald Trump
University of Mississippi alumni
White House Fellows
Yale Law School alumni